The Cataract Falls Covered Bridge is a covered bridge that spans Mill Creek in Lieber State Recreation Area, Owen County, Indiana. Built in 1876 by the Smith Bridge company of Toledo, Ohio, it was at one time one of the most famous and photographed covered bridges in the United States. It is the only remaining one in Owen County.

Since the road bypassed the bridge in 1988, it is only open to pedestrians. It was added to the National Register of Historic Places in 2005.

See also
Cataract Falls (Indiana)
List of bridges documented by the Historic American Engineering Record in Indiana

References

External links

Covered bridges on the National Register of Historic Places in Indiana
Bridges completed in 1876
Historic American Engineering Record in Indiana
Transportation buildings and structures in Owen County, Indiana
National Register of Historic Places in Owen County, Indiana
Road bridges on the National Register of Historic Places in Indiana
Wooden bridges in Indiana